Daniel Pecsi is a male former international table tennis player from Hungary.

Table tennis career
He won four medals in singles, doubles, and team events in the World Table Tennis Championships in 1926 and 1928.

The four World Championship medals included three gold medals; two in the team event and one in doubles at the 1926 World Table Tennis Championships with Roland Jacobi. He also won two English Open titles.

See also
 List of table tennis players
 List of World Table Tennis Championships medalists

References

Hungarian male table tennis players
Place of birth missing
Year of birth missing
Year of death missing
20th-century Hungarian people